Lawrence O'Toole is a Canadian former journalist, best known as a film, dance and theatre critic for The Globe and Mail and Maclean's in the 1970s and 1980s. After moving to New York City in 1988, he was a contributor to Time, Entertainment Weekly, GQ and The New York Times, and volunteered for an AIDS service organization. In 1994, he published Heart's Longing: Newfoundland, New York and the Distance Home, a memoir of his experience growing up in Newfoundland and Labrador, coming out as gay as an adult, and later returning to his hometown of Renews for a visit. The book was an expansion of an article he had previously written for Saturday Night.

He also published at least one short story, "Goin' to Town with Katie Ann", which was featured in the 1990 Journey Prize anthology.

References

External links
Lawrence O'Toole Realty 

Year of birth missing (living people)
Living people
Canadian film critics
Canadian theatre critics
Canadian male short story writers
Canadian expatriate writers in the United States
Maclean's writers and editors
The Globe and Mail people
The New York Times writers
Canadian LGBT journalists
Gay memoirists
Canadian gay writers
Writers from Newfoundland and Labrador
People from Renews-Cappahayden
People from Kingston, New York
Canadian memoirists
20th-century Canadian short story writers
20th-century Canadian male writers
Canadian male non-fiction writers
20th-century Canadian LGBT people